Old Fort 217 is an Indian reserve of the Mikisew Cree First Nation in Alberta, located within Regional Municipality of Wood Buffalo. In the 2016 Canadian Census, it recorded a population of 0 living in 0 private dwellings. In 2001, there were 5 people living on-reserve.

References 

Regional Municipality of Wood Buffalo
Indian reserves in Alberta